The Hurasagar River, or Hoorsagar, is a major river of Bangladesh that formerly flowed into the Ganges, but now joins the Jamuna. It receives water from the Baral, the Phuljhar (which is the combination of the Karatoya and the Bangali).

It is joined to the Ichhamati River by a system of locks.

References

External links

Rivers of Bangladesh
Rivers of Dhaka Division